Neville "Chappy" Williams is an elder of the Wiradjuri Nation, in Western New South Wales, and a former professional boxer. Known as "Uncle Chappy" to those who follow indigenous Australian customs, he is a regular at the Aboriginal Tent Embassy in Canberra and a key opponent of the Barrick Gold Corporation's gold mine project at Lake Cowal. Barrick sold the Cowal Mine to Evolution Mining in 2015.

William's most prominent victory as a professional boxer came on June 7, 1972 in Sydney's Riverwood Legion Club when he knocked out popular boxer, fellow Australian Wally Carr in the third round. In his previous fight, Williams had fought for the Australian national Featherweight title but lost by first round knockout to champion Lucky Gattellari at the Apia Club in Sydney on April 18, 1972.

See also
Wiradjuri
Prominent indigenous Australians

References

External links
 February 2005 report from the Aboriginal Tent Embassy (published on the Australian Broadcasting Corporation website) includes a quote from Uncle Chappy Williams

Indigenous Australian boxers
Australian indigenous rights activists
Australian environmentalists
Living people
Year of birth missing (living people)
Place of birth missing (living people)
Wiradjuri people
Australian male boxers
Lightweight boxers